Herlev Kommune is a suburban municipality (Danish, kommune) in Region Hovedstaden on the island of Zealand (Sjælland) in eastern Denmark. The municipality covers an area of 12 km², and has a total population of 28,867 (1. January 2022).  Its mayor is Thomas Gyldal Petersen, a member of the Social Democrats (Socialdemokraterne) political party. The former village Herlev is the largest settlement of the municipal and the site of the municipal council.

Neighboring municipalities are Gladsaxe to the east and northeast, Furesø Municipality to the north, Ballerup to the west, Glostrup to the southwest, Rødovre to the south, and Copenhagen to the southeast.

Herlev municipality was not merged with other municipalities on 1 January 2007 as part of nationwide Kommunalreformen ("The Municipal Reform" of 2007).

Politics

Municipal council
Herlev's municipal council consists of 19 members, elected every four years.

Below are the municipal councils elected since the Municipal Reform of 2007.

Twin towns – sister cities

Herlev is twinned with:

 Eberswalde, Germany
 Gniewkowo, Poland
 Höganäs, Sweden
 Lieto, Finland
 Nesodden, Norway
 Seltjarnarnes, Iceland
 Sermersooq, Greenland

See also

 Herlev Hospital
 Herlev station

References 

 Municipal statistics: NetBorger Kommunefakta, delivered from KMD aka Kommunedata (Municipal Data)
 Municipal mergers and neighbors: Eniro new municipalities map

External links

 
Municipalities in the Capital Region of Denmark
Municipalities of Denmark
Copenhagen metropolitan area